Cruz Alta may refer to:
Cruz Alta Department, Tucumán Province, Argentina
Cruz Alta, Rio Grande do Sul, Brazil